Elek Gábor (born 5 November 1970) is a Hungarian former handball player and current coach of Ferencvárosi TC.

He coached Hungary at the 2020 European Women's Handball Championship.

Achievements

Manager
Ferencvárosi TC
Nemzeti Bajnokság I:
Winner: 2015

Magyar Kupa:
Winner: 2017
Finalist: 2015, 2019

Personal life
He is son of Gyula Elek and Anna Rothermel. Elek remarried Zita Szucsánszki with whom he has a son (b. 2019). He holds a degree in chemical engineering.

References

1970 births
Living people
Hungarian male handball players
Hungarian handball coaches
Handball players from Budapest
Handball coaches of international teams